Ghost-Town Gold is a 1936 American Western film directed by Joseph Kane and was the second entry of the 51-film series of Western "Three Mesquiteers" B-movies. It was based on the 1935 novel of the same name by William Colt MacDonald.

Plot
Having earned a tidy sum from the sale of some cattle they drove, The Three Mesquiteers reluctantly send the gambling addict Lullaby Joslin to bank their cheque from the sale. Lullaby wins Elmer, a ventriloquist dummy at a crooked carnival by cheating at a game of Three Card Monte, replacing all his cards with Aces. Lullaby and Elmer are on a roll and arrive at the bank just after it closes.

During the night the bank is robbed, the Three Mesquiteers stay on to help the bank, including Tucson Smith taking the place of a champion in a prize fight, and apprehend the robbers who hid the money in a ghost town.

Cast
Robert Livingston as Stony Brooke
Ray Corrigan as Tucson Smith
Max Terhune as Lullaby Joslin
Kay Hughes as Sabina Thornton
LeRoy Mason as Dirk Barrington
Burr Caruth as Mayor Ben Thornton
Bob Kortman as Monk (Barrington's Henchman)
Milburn Morante as Jake Rawlins
Frank Hagney as 'Wild Man' Joe Kamatski
Don Roberts as O'Brien's manager
F. Herrick Herrick as Catlett, the Fight Promoter
Robert C. Thomas as 'Thunderbolt' O'Brien, the Champ
Yakima Canutt as Buck (Barrington's Henchman)
Hank Worden as	Mr. Crabtree

References

External links

1936 films
American black-and-white films
1936 Western (genre) films
Films directed by Joseph Kane
Republic Pictures films
Three Mesquiteers films
American Western (genre) films
Films produced by Nat Levine
Films based on Western (genre) novels
1930s English-language films
1930s American films